During the Dachau liberation reprisals, German SS troops were killed by U.S. soldiers and concentration camp internees at the Dachau concentration camp on April 29, 1945, during World War II. It is unclear how many SS men were killed in the incident, but most estimates place the number killed at around 35–50. In the days before the camp's liberation, SS guards at the camp had forced 7,000 inmates on a death march that resulted in the death of many from exposure and shooting. When Allied soldiers liberated Dachau, they were variously shocked, horrified, disturbed, and angered at finding the massed corpses of internees, and by the combativeness of some of the remaining guards who allegedly fired on them.

Discoveries

On April 29, 1945, soldiers of the 3rd Battalion, 157th Infantry Regiment, 45th Infantry Division, commanded by Lieutenant Colonel Felix L. Sparks, approaching the sprawling Dachau complex from the southwest, found 39 railway boxcars containing some 2,000 skeletal corpses parked on rail tracks just outside the complex itself. Brain tissue was splattered on the ground from one victim found nearby with a crushed skull. The smell of decaying bodies and human excrement, and the sight of naked, emaciated bodies induced vomiting, crying, disbelief, and rage in the advancing troops. Advancing soldiers from H Company, 22nd Regiment used a loudspeaker to call on the SS to surrender, but they continued to fire in bursts.

Upon moving deeper into the complex, and the prisoner area itself, the soldiers found more bodies. Some had been dead for hours or days before the camp's capture and lay where they had died. Soldiers reported seeing a row of concrete structures that contained rooms full of hundreds of naked and barely clothed dead bodies piled floor to ceiling, a coal-fired crematorium, and a gas chamber. "The stench of death was overpowering," Sparks recalled.

Surrender
According to Harold Marcuse, American professor of German history, camp commander SS-Hauptsturmführer Martin Weiss, together with the camp guards and the SS garrisons, had fled the camp before the arrival of U.S. troops. SS-Untersturmführer Heinrich Wicker (murdered after the surrender) was left in charge and had roughly 560 personnel at his disposal; these came from conscripted inmates of the SS disciplinary prison inside the Dachau concentration camp and Hungarian Waffen-SS troops.

On April 29, Dachau was surrendered to Brigadier General Henning Linden of the 42nd Infantry Division of the U.S. Army by Untersturmführer Wicker. According to Linden, he arrived at the command post in Dachau at about 15:00 and proceeded to make his way across the Amper River to the site of the complex, approximately one-half kilometre south of the bridge he crossed. He proceeded to take control of the camp in some tumult; thereafter, he toured the camp with a group of reporters (including Marguerite Higgins). A description of the surrender appears in Linden's memorandum to Maj. Gen. Harry J. Collins, entitled Report on Surrender of Dachau Concentration Camp:

Capture communiqué
Supreme Allied Commander General Dwight D. Eisenhower issued a communiqué regarding the capture of Dachau concentration camp: "Our forces liberated and mopped up the infamous concentration camp at Dachau. Approximately 32,000 prisoners were liberated; 300 SS camp guards were quickly neutralized."

Military historian Earl Ziemke describes the event:

Killings by U.S. soldiers

Sparks account
Lt. Col. Sparks, a battalion commander of the 157th Infantry Regiment, 45th Infantry Division wrote about the incident. Sparks watched as about 50 German prisoners captured by the 157th Infantry Regiment were confined in an area that had been used for storing coal. The German POWs were watched over by a machine gun team from Company I. He left those men behind to head towards the center of the camp where there were SS who had not yet surrendered; he had only gone a short distance when he heard a soldier yell, "They're trying to get away!" and then machine-gun fire coming from the area he had just left. He ran back and kicked a 19-year-old soldier nicknamed "Birdeye" who was manning the machine gun and who had killed about 12 of the prisoners and wounded several more. The gunner, who was crying hysterically, said that the prisoners had tried to escape. Sparks said that he doubted the story; Sparks placed an NCO on the gun before resuming his journey towards the center of the camp. Sparks further stated:

Buechner account
In the U.S. military Investigation of Alleged Mistreatment of German Guards at Dachau conducted by Lt. Col. Joseph Whitaker, the account given by Howard Buechner (then a first lieutenant in the United States Army and medical officer with the 3rd Battalion, 157th Infantry) to Whitaker on May 5, 1945, did not contradict the Sparks account. Buechner's sworn testimony was that around 16:00 he arrived in the yard where the German soldiers had been shot, and that he "saw 15 or 16 dead and wounded German soldiers lying along the wall". He noted that some of the wounded soldiers were still moving, but he did not examine any of them. He answered "Yes, sir" when asked if he was the surgeon of the 3rd Battalion, 157th Infantry, at that time, and did not know if any medical attention was called for the wounded.

According to Buechner's 1986 book, Dachau: The Hour of the Avenger: An Eyewitness Account, U.S. forces killed 520 German soldiers, including 346 killed on the orders of 1st Lt. Jack Bushyhead, in an alleged mass execution in the coal yard several hours after the first hospital shooting. Buechner did not witness the alleged incident, and his sworn testimony was that he "saw 15 or 16 dead and wounded German soldiers lying along the wall." His sworn testimony in the official investigation report also did not include any mention of a second shooting. David L. Israel disputed this account in his book The Day the Thunderbird Cried:

Jürgen Zarusky also concluded that Buechner's claims were incorrect.

Other accounts
Abram Sachar reported, "Some of the Nazis were rounded up and summarily executed along with the guard dogs."

According to Jürgen Zarusky (originally published in a 1997 article in Dachauer Hefte), 16 SS men were shot in the coal yard (one more killed by a camp inmate), 17 at Tower B, and perhaps a few more killed by U.S. soldiers in the incident. Anywhere from a few to 25 or 50 more were killed by inmates. Zarusky's research makes use of the detailed interrogation records contained in Whitaker's official May 1945 investigation report, which became accessible in 1992, as well as a collection of documents compiled by General Henning Linden's son.

The Dachau liberation reprisals were documented among others by U.S. Army photographers Paul Averitt, George Gaberlavage, Sidney Rachlin and Ed Royce, Sr.

Killings by the inmates
Walenty Lenarczyk, a prisoner at Dachau, stated that following the camp's liberation "prisoners swarmed over the wire and grabbed the Americans and lifted them to their shoulders... other prisoners caught the SS men... The first SS man elbowed one or two prisoners out of his way, but the courage of the prisoners mounted, they knocked them down and nobody could see whether they were stomped or what, but they were killed." Elsewhere in the camp SS men, Kapos and informers were beaten badly with fists, sticks and shovels. There was at least one incident where US soldiers looked away as two prisoners beat a German guard to death with a shovel, and Lt. Bill Walsh witnessed one such beating. Another soldier witnessed an inmate stomping on an SS trooper's face until "there wasn't much left." When the soldier said to him, "You've got a lot of hate in your heart," he simply nodded.

An American chaplain was told by three young Jewish men, who had left the camp during liberation, that they had beaten to death one of the more sadistic SS guards when they discovered him hiding in a barn, dressed as a peasant.

United States Army investigation
Lt. Col. Joseph Whitaker, the Seventh Army's Assistant Inspector General, was ordered to investigate after witnesses came forward testifying about the killings. He issued a report on June 8, 1945, called the Investigation of Alleged Mistreatment of German Guards at Dachau, also known as The I.G. Report. In 1991, an archived copy was found in the National Archives in Washington, D.C., and made public.

Whitaker reported that close to the back entrance to the camp, Lt. William P. Walsh, commander of Company "I", 157th Infantry, shot four German soldiers in a boxcar who had surrendered to him. Pvt. Albert C. Pruitt then climbed into the boxcar and performed a coup de grâce on the wounded men.

After he had entered the camp, Walsh, along with Lt. Jack Bushyhead, the executive officer of Company "I", organized the segregation of POWs into those who were members of the Wehrmacht and those who were in the SS. The SS were marched into a separate enclosure and shot by members of "I" Company with several different types of weapons.

The investigation resulted in the U.S. military considering courts-martial against those involved, including battalion commander Lt. Col. Felix Sparks, while Lt. Howard Buechner was cited in the report for dereliction of duty for not giving medical aid to the wounded SS men in the coal yard. However, Gen. George S. Patton, recently appointed military governor of Bavaria, chose to dismiss the charges. Therefore, the witnesses to the killings were never cross-examined in court.

Col. Charles L. Decker, an acting deputy judge advocate, concluded in late 1945 that, while there had probably been a violation of international law, "in the light of the conditions which greeted the eyes of the first combat troops, it is not believed that justice or equity demand that the difficult and perhaps impossible task of fixing individual responsibility now be undertaken".

See also
 List of massacres in Germany
 Allied war crimes during World War II

Notes

References

Further reading
 Complete transcript of the US Army investigation Boston.com | Boston Globe Online | Nation | The Secret History of World War II
 Goodell, Stephen, Kevin A Mahoney; Sybil Milton (1995). "1945: The Year of Liberation". Washington, D.C., U.S.: U.S. Holocaust Memorial Museum. 
 Marcuse, Harold (2001). "Legacies of Dachau : The Uses and Abuses of a Concentration Camp, 1933–2001". Cambridge University Press. 
 Zarusky, Jürgen, "'That is not the American Way of Fighting:' The Shooting of Captured SS-Men During the Liberation of Dachau," in: Wolfgang Benz, Barbara Distel (eds.): Dachau and the Nazi Terror 1933–1945, vol. 2, Studies and Reports (Dachau 2002), pp. 133–160. (German original in Dachauer Hefte vol. 13, 1997).

1945 in Germany
Dachau concentration camp
Extrajudicial killings in World War II
Massacres in 1945
Massacres in Germany
Military history of the United States during World War II
Murder in Bavaria
World War II prisoner of war massacres by the United States